"(When You Feel Like You're in Love) Don't Just Stand There" is a song written by Tacoma, Washington country/western artist Cherokee Jack Henley, as revised by Ernest Tubb. The best known recording is the 1952 single by Carl Smith. The single was Carl Smith's second number one on the Country & Western Best Seller charts, staying at the top for five weeks with a total of twenty-four weeks on the chart.

References

1952 singles
Carl Smith (musician) songs
Year of song missing